This is a list of tetragraphs in the Latin script. These are most common in Irish orthography. For Cyrillic tetragraphs, see tetragraph#Cyrillic  ลง.

Arrernte
Tetragraphs in Arrernte transcribe single consonants, but are largely predictable from their components.

 is 

 is 

 is

English
The majority of English tetragraphs make vowel sounds:   

 is pronounced , as in straight.

 is pronounced  in Received Pronunciation (RP), as in millionaire.

 is pronounced  in RP, as in bizarre.

 is pronounced  in RP, as in catarrh.

 is pronounced , as in caught.

 is pronounced  in RP, as in prayer.

 is pronounced  in RP, as in mayor.

 is pronounced , as in queue.

 is pronounced  in RP, as in myrrh.

There are four examples of vowel tetragraphs that are found only in proper nouns:

 is pronounced  in RP, as found in Shakespeare.

 is pronounced  in RP, as found in Worcestershire.

 is pronounced  in RP, as found in Moore.

 is pronounced , as found in Hughes.

Three consonant tetragraphs exist in English that are more commonly sounded as two separate digraphs. However, when used in word-initial position they become one single sound:

 is pronounced  as in chthonian. Pronounced as two digraphs  in autochthonous.

 is pronounced  as in phthisis.

 is pronounced  as in shcherbakovite, a mineral named after Russian geochemist and mineralogist, Dmitri Ivanovich Shcherbakov.

French
 is used to write the sound  in a few words such as myrtillier .

In addition, trigraphs are sometimes followed by silent letters, and these sequences may be confused with tetragraphs:

 is pronounced  in words such as "grecque" and "Mecque", where the trigraph cqu is followed by the feminine suffix e.

 is pronounced  when the silent plural suffix x is added to the trigraph eau.

German

 represents  in loanwords such as Dschungel ("jungle"), Aserbaidschan ("Azerbaijan"), Tadschikistan ("Tajikistan"), Kambodscha ("Cambodia") and Dschingis Khan ("Genghis Khan").

 represents , which is a relatively uncommon phoneme in German but appears in some very common words like deutsch ("German"), Deutschland ("Germany"), Tschechien ("Czech Republic"), and tschüss ("bye").

Hmong
There are several sequences of four letters in the Romanized Popular Alphabet that transcribe what may be single consonants, depending on the analysis. However, their pronunciations are predictable from their components.

Irish

Used between two velarized ("broad") consonants:

Used between two palatalized ("slender") consonants:

Used between a broad and a slender consonant:

Used between a slender and a broad consonant:

Juǀʼhoan
The apostrophe was used with three trigraphs for click consonants in the 1987 orthography of Juǀʼhoan.  The apostrophe is a diacritic rather than a letter in Juǀʼhoan.

 for 

 for 

 for 

 for

Piedmontese
Piedmontese does not have tetragraphs.

Others

 is used in the practical orthography of the Taa language, where it represents the prevoiced affricate .

However, the apostrophe is a diacritic in Swahili, not a letter, so this is not a true tetragraph.

 is used in Yanyuwa to write a pre-velar nasal, .

 is used in the Puter orthographic variety of the Romansh language (spoken in the Upper Engadin area in Switzerland) for the sequence  (while the similar trigraph  denotes the sounds  and ). It is not part of the orthography of Rumantsch Grischun, but is used in place names like S-chanf and in the Puter orthography used locally in schools again since 2011.

 is used in Xhosa to write the sound . It is often replaced with the ambiguous trigraph .

References 

Latin-script tetragraphs